Delhi Public School, Dhanbad, Jharkhand, India, was established in 1988 in collaboration with Bharat Coking Coal Limited. It is an English medium co-educational school affiliated to the Central Board of Secondary Education, New Delhi. This is one of the schools run by the Delhi Public School Society, New Delhi. It was inaugurated by Shri. Salman Khurshid.

The principal is Dr.Sarita Sinha. The current vice principal is Mr. Reza Isteaque.

Location and transport
DPS, Dhanbad, is located 4.2 km from the Dhanbad railway station. It is located in Karmik Nagar, in the vicinity of the Indian Institute of Technology (Indian School of Mines), Dhanbad. Smart class facility is available for classes Nursery to 10.

Achievements
 105 students secured 10 CGPA in Central Board of Secondary Education 10th boards in 2017.
 128 students scored 90+ in CBSE 12th boards 2017.
 Ranked No. 1 in Dhanbad district and ranked 4th in Jharkhand.

References

External links 
 Official website of DPS Giridih
 Official website of DPS Bokaro
 DPS Society

Schools in Jharkhand
Delhi Public School Society
Education in Dhanbad
1988 establishments in Bihar
Educational institutions established in 1988